Moishe Zylberfarb was a Ukrainian politician, diplomat, and public activist of Jewish descent. He was one of the authors of the Law of Ukraine about national-individual autonomy (1918) which later was canceled by the Communist regime.

Brief biography
Zylberfarb was born in Rovno in 1876. In 1906 he became a founder of the group Vozrozhdenie and the Jewish Socialist Workers Party (SERP). From the very beginning he was a member of the Central Council of Ukraine (March 1917) as member of the United Jewish Socialist Workers Party. Zylberfarb was a member of Little Council. On 27 July 1917 he became a Jewish representative at the General Secretariat of Ukraine (regional government of the Russian Republic). During the October Revolution Zylberfarb became a member of the Regional Committee in Protection of Revolution in Ukraine. After the independence of Ukraine, Zylberfarb became a Minister of Jewish Affairs in Ukraine. During 1918 to 1920 he was a rector at the Jewish National University and the Society in support of development of Jewish Culture (Culture League) in Kiev. In 1921 Zylberfarb moved to Warsaw where he headed ORT. He died in Otwock in 1934, and was buried in Warsaw.

Works
Jewish ministry and Jewish autonomy in Ukraine (1919)

References

External links
Moishe Zylberfarb at the Encyclopedia of History of Ukraine
Moishe Zylberfarb at the Russian Jewish Encyclopedia
Moishe Zylberfarb at the Electronic Jewish Encyclopedia

1876 births
1934 deaths
Politicians from Rivne
People from Volhynian Governorate
Jews from the Russian Empire
Ukrainian Jews
Members of the Central Council of Ukraine
Jewish ministers of Ukraine
Jewish Socialist Workers Party politicians
United Jewish Socialist Workers Party politicians
Jewish socialists
Jewish Ukrainian politicians